The 14th Virginia Regiment was raised on September 16, 1776, in western Virginia for service with the Continental Army. The regiment would see action at the Battle of Brandywine, Battle of Germantown, Battle of Monmouth, and Siege of Charleston. Most of the regiment was captured at Charlestown, South Carolina, on May 12, 1780, by the British Army. The regiment was formally disbanded on November 15, 1783.

References

External links
Bibliography of the Continental Army in Virginia compiled by the United States Army Center of Military History

14th Virginia Regiment
Military units and formations established in 1776
Military units and formations disestablished in 1780